That's Our Song is an album released by Israeli folk duo Esther & Abi Ofarim. It was released in Europe on Philips Records in 1965. The album was released as Neue Songs Der Welt (New Songs of the World) in Germany.

Recording and release 

On this album arranged and conducted by Heinz Alisch, Esther & Abi Ofarim cover various international folk recordings, including songs by Bob Dylan, Peter, Paul and Mary, and the Negro spiritual "Go Tell It on the Mountain." The track "La Guajira" is a rendition of "Al vaivén de mi carreta" by Cuban musician Ñico Saquito.

The album was at the top of the German Album chart by December 1965. Neue Songs Der Welt was the first of three No. 1 albums for the duo in Germany. The album spent a total of 80 weeks on the charts (October 15, 1965 – May 15, 1967), including 56 weeks in the Top 10 and 12 weeks at the top of the chart.

Track listing

Chart performance

References 

Esther & Abi Ofarim albums
1965 albums
Philips Records albums
Albums produced by Abi Ofarim